Joseph Bradford (22 January 1901 – 6 September 1980) was an English professional footballer who played as a centre forward. Born in Peggs Green, near Coalville, Leicestershire, Bradford made nearly 450 appearances for Birmingham in all competitions, scoring 267 goals. He was capped 12 times for England, scoring seven goals, and played five times for a representative Football League XI.

He is Birmingham's all-time leading goalscorer. He topped the club's scoring charts in all but one First Division season between 1921–22 and 1932–33, and if goals in all competitions are counted, he was top scorer in all twelve of those seasons. Bradford also scored Birmingham's only goal of the 1931 FA Cup Final, in which they were beaten by West Bromwich Albion.

He died in Birmingham aged 79.

Honours
Birmingham
FA Cup finalist: 1930–31

References 

1901 births
1980 deaths
People from Coalville
English footballers
England international footballers
Association football forwards
Coalville Town F.C. players
Birmingham City F.C. players
Bristol City F.C. players
English Football League players
English Football League representative players
People from North West Leicestershire District
Footballers from Leicestershire
FA Cup Final players